The 2006 Clipsal 500 Adelaide was the first round of the 2006 V8 Supercar Championship Series. It took place from 23 to 26 March 2006 and was the eighth in a sequence of "Adelaide 500" events for V8 Supercars to be held at the Adelaide Parklands Circuit in Adelaide, South Australia.

Qualifying

Qualifying
The qualifying for the Clipsal 500 Adelaide took place on Friday, 24 March 2006. As in the case of most V8 Supercar races, there was a Top Ten Shootout which could make the person that qualified first drop to tenth and vice versa. Kiwi Jason Richards, in his Tasman Motorsport Holden qualified first.

Top Ten Shootout
The official name for the winner of the top team shootout winner is the Armor-All Pole Position Award.
The Top Ten Shootout also took place on the Friday. The person who finished tenth in qualifying goes first, and First goes last. The drivers get only one lap to record their best time.

The Holden Racing Team got a one-two result in this, with Mark Skaife finishing first and Todd Kelly finishing second. The Lion (Holden) dominated the top ten shootout with 8 of the 10 drivers driving a VZ Commodore. There were only two Ford's in the Top Ten, Team Triple 888's Jamie Whincup and Craig Lowndes.

Qualifying results

Top Ten Shootout results

Race results

Race 1

Race 2

References

External links
V8 Supercars Website

Adelaide 500
Clipsal 500 Adelaide
2000s in Adelaide